The Vermont Lake Monsters are a collegiate summer baseball team located in Burlington, Vermont. From 1994 to 2020, they were members of Minor League Baseball's New York–Penn League (NYPL). They play their home games at Centennial Field, one of the oldest minor league stadiums, on the campus of the University of Vermont.

The team was previously located in Jamestown, New York, (as the Jamestown Expos) from 1977 to 1993. With Major League Baseball's reorganization of the minor leagues after the 2020 season, Vermont was not selected to continue in affiliated baseball. In 2021, the team joined the Futures Collegiate Baseball League.

History

Early teams
The Vermont Lake Monsters were preceded in Burlington by a Burlington team in the Northeastern League (1887), a Burlington team in the Northern New York League (1903–1905), the Burlington Burlingtons of the Vermont State League/New Hampshire State League (1907) and Burlington A's of the Provincial League (baseball) (1955). After a gap in between hosting minor league teams, the Vermont Reds and Vermont Mariners of the Eastern League (1984-1988) directly preceded the Vermont Expos.

Montreal Expos (1993–2004)
In 1993, Burlington businessman Ray Pecor, Jr., the owner of Lake Champlain Transportation Company in Burlington since 1976, purchased the Jamestown Expos and moved the franchise to Burlington, retaining the Expos name. The Vermont Expos played their first game at Centennial Field on June 16, 1994. More than 5,000 people attended the home opener—a 6-5 loss to the Pittsfield Mets.

Washington Nationals (2005–2010)
The Montreal Expos announced on September 29, 2004, that they would move to Washington, D.C., after the 2004 season. They would rename themselves the Washington Nationals. Minor League Baseball gives clubs 60 days after the end of the season to change their names and logos. Vermont did not have enough time for an identity change and retained the Expos nickname for the 2005 season.

During the 2005 season, the club announced its plan to change the nickname and solicited suggestions from its fans. The team received 30,000 fan suggestions for the new name via a name-the-team contest. The New York Times reported that the two leading contenders were "Green Mountain Boys" and "Lakemonsters". At the end of the contest, the winning name was "Champs", but as the team had not made the playoffs at that point since 1995, management did not think it was appropriate.

They announced the new name, "Lake Monsters", and revealed the new team colors and uniforms on November 15, 2005. The Expos colors of red, white, and blue were replaced with the Lake Monster colors of navy blue, Columbia blue, and lime green. The name references Champ, the legendary Lake Champlain monster which had been the team's mascot since 1994. The club's last game as the Vermont Expos was on September 8, 2005. They opened the 2006 season as the Vermont Lake Monsters.

Expos legacy
The franchise was the last professional ball club to carry the Expos name. While baseball fans in Burlington tend to root for the Red Sox, New York Mets, or New York Yankees, Montreal was the closest Major League Baseball team until moving to Washington, D.C., 2005. Fans along the border towns rooted for the Expos until the move.

On July 22, 2005, the Vermont Expos held their first "Tribute to the Expos" promotion and honored Andre Dawson at Centennial Field. While the club changed its name to the "Lake Monsters" in 2006, the organization held its second "tribute to the Expos". The club honored pitcher Dennis Martínez and wore powder-blue Expos uniforms with the Expos name on the front and a Lake Monsters patch on the left sleeve. On August 5, 2007, the Lake Monsters honored the Expos again and brought Tim Wallach to Burlington.

Oakland Athletics (2011–2020)
Following the 2010 season, the Lake Monsters ended their affiliation with the Nationals and entered into a new player development contract (a working relationship between Major and Minor League teams) with the Oakland Athletics. This marked the first new MLB affiliation in the Lake Monsters' 17-year history. Vermont began its first year as an affiliate of the Oakland A's in June 2011. Ahead of the 2021 season, the Oakland Athletics ended their affiliation with the Lake Monsters, ending the 10-season affiliation with the team.

Collegiate (2021–)
Following the 2020 season, the whole of Minor League baseball was re-organized and many teams were eliminated. The entire single-A short season New York–Penn League was eliminated. Three league teams moved to the new High A level. The Lake Monsters joined the Futures Collegiate Baseball League, a wooden bat college league. In their inaugural season, the Lake Monsters won the 2021 Futures Collegiate Baseball League championship, defeating the Pittsfield Suns in the 3-game championship series 2-1.

Playoffs
1995: Defeated Hudson Valley 2–0 in semifinals; lost to Watertown 2–1 in finals.
1996: Defeated Pittsfield 2–0 in semifinals; defeated St. Catharines 2–1 to win championship.
2011: Lost to Auburn 2–0 in semifinals.
2017: Defeated Mahoning Valley 2–0 in semifinals; lost to Hudson Valley 2–0 in finals.
2021: Defeated Worcester Bravehearts 2-0 in semifinals; defeated Pittsfield Suns 2-1 to win Futures Collegiate Baseball League championship
2022: Defeated Westfield Starfires 2-0 in Semifinals; lost to Nashua Silver Knights 2-1 in the finals.

Notable alumni

Geoff Blum (1994)
Michael Barrett (1995)
Orlando Cabrera (1995)
Jamey Carroll (1996)
Milton Bradley (1997)
Jorge Julio (1998)
Wilson Valdez (1999)
Jason Bay (2000)
Brandon Watson (2000)
Jason Bergmann (2002)
Darrell Rasner (2002)
Ian Desmond (2004)
John Lannan (2005)
Marco Estrada (2005)
Michael Martínez (2006)
Justin Maxwell (2006)
Cole Kimball (2007)
Jordan Zimmermann (2007)
Danny Espinosa (2008)
Tom Milone (2008)
Tyler Moore (2008)
Derek Norris (2008)
Brad Peacock (2008)
Steven Souza (2008)
Sandy León (2009)
Aaron Barrett (2010)
A. J. Cole (2010)
Ryan Mattheus (2010)
Addison Russell (2012)
Matt Olson (2012)
Chad Pinder (2013)
Seth Brown (2015)
Sean Murphy (2016)

Roster

References

External links
 

Baseball teams established in 1994
New York–Penn League teams
Sports in Burlington, Vermont
Professional baseball teams in Vermont
Montreal Expos minor league affiliates
Washington Nationals minor league affiliates
Oakland Athletics minor league affiliates
1994 establishments in Vermont